Altındağ, historically Kefercebel, is a village in the Nizip District, Gaziantep Province, Turkey. It had a population of 329 in 2022.

References

Villages in Nizip District